Andrew Chapin (February 7, 1952 – December 31, 1985) was an American keyboardist best known for his short stint with the Ricky Nelson Band, which ended in 1985 when Nelson and his bandmates died after Nelson's personal DC-3 aircraft crashed on New Year's Eve in De Kalb, Texas while en route to a performance in Dallas, Texas.  Prior to joining Ricky Nelson, Chapin had been a member of The Association and before that of Steppenwolf, with whom he had recorded Hour of the Wolf in 1975, the band's first album recorded without founding keyboardist Goldy McJohn. The official explanation for Chapin’s departure from Steppenwolf was that he disliked touring; he was subsequently replaced by Wayne Cook.

See also
Death of Ricky Nelson

References

External links

1951 births
1985 deaths
Accidental deaths in Texas
Victims of aviation accidents or incidents in 1985
Victims of aviation accidents or incidents in the United States
Steppenwolf (band) members
20th-century American keyboardists
The Association members
Musicians killed in aviation accidents or incidents